Namita Kumari Dali (born 16 June 1991, in Chandranigahapur) is a Nepalese women footballer who plays for the Nepal Police Club and the national team. She represented Nepal at the 2012 SAFF Women's Championship, playing in the final against India.

Dali also played in the 2014 SAFF Women's Championship, coming on as a 44th-minute substitute in a humiliating 6–0 final loss to India.

References 

1991 births
Living people
People from Rautahat District
Nepalese women's footballers
Nepal women's international footballers
Women's association football goalkeepers
South Asian Games silver medalists for Nepal
South Asian Games medalists in football